Darshan Singh may refer to:

 Darshan Singh (field hockey) (born 1938), Indian field hockey player
 Darshan Singh (Spiritual Master) (1921–1989), founder of Sawan Kirpal Ruhani Mission
 Darshan Singh (executioner)

See also
 List of people with surname Singh
Darshan (disambiguation)